Phong Điền is a rural district of Cần Thơ in the Mekong Delta region of Vietnam. As of 2003, the district had a population of 102,621. As of 2018, the population had risen to 123,126. Phong Điền was established by Decree No. 05/2004/ND-CP dated January 2, 2004. To the east it borders Ninh Kiều district and Cái Răng district, and to the west it borders Hậu Giang province and Bình Thủy district.

Administrative divisions
The district is divided into one town, Phong Điền (753.82 ha, 11,852 people (2007)), with municipal status, and 6 communes:

Nhơn Ái: 1,559.5 ha, 15,031 people (2007)
Nhơn Nghĩa
Tân Thới
Giai Xuân
Mỹ Khánh
Trường Long

References

Districts of Cần Thơ